"Feds Watching" is a song written and performed by American rapper 2 Chainz featuring fellow American musician Pharrell Williams. Produced by the latter, it released on June 4, 2013 as the lead single from the former's second studio album B.O.A.T.S. II: Me Time (2013). The song has since peaked at number 66 on the Billboard Hot 100.

Background
On June 2, 2013, 2 Chainz premiered "Feds Watching" at the Hot 97's Summer Jam, the first single from his second studio album. The song features Pharrell Williams and was recorded on 2013 Grammy Awards night. The song was released to iTunes two days later, on June 4, 2013.

Music video
The music video, released June 30, 2013 and was directed by Ryan Hope. A theme highly emphasized in the music video is that 2 Chainz featured many dark-skinned women as extras in the video.

Billboard gave the music video a positive review stating: "It should be illegal for this many attractive women to be in the same place at the same time. 'Feds Watching' serves a disproportional male to female ratio in an exotic, secluded bachelor pad.".

The Huffington Post also gave the video a positive review stating: "2 Chainz' 'Feds Watching' video follows the luxury rap music video formula with one notable twist. In the song, 2 Chainz raps about sporting Commes des Garcons and Alexander Wang clothing because 'if the Fed's watching,' he'd like to be 'fresh as hell.' (It turns out, of course, that they are watching.) The visuals for the song are appropriately lavish, with most of the action taking place in a Los Angeles mansion perched above the city."

Critical reception 
Rolling Stone ranked the song at 81 on their list of the 100 best songs of 2013. Pitchfork Media positioned it at number 69 on their list of the 100 best songs of 2013. It was ranked at number 23 on XXLs list of the 25 best songs of the year.

Remixes
A remix was released on September 1, 2013 via Lil Wayne's mixtape, Dedication 5. The remix features verses from Lil Wayne and T.I. All three artists were on tour together at the time of the recording. Nelly also released a remix of the song.

Track listing
 Digital single

Charts

Weekly charts

Year-end charts

Certifications

Release history

References

External links 

2013 singles
2 Chainz songs
Pharrell Williams songs
Song recordings produced by Pharrell Williams
Songs written by Pharrell Williams
Def Jam Recordings singles
2013 songs
Songs written by 2 Chainz